ISCE – Instituto Superior de Lisboa e Vale do Tejo – is a Portuguese private polytechnic higher education institution, located in Odivelas that offers courses in the education area, including child education, cultural animation, gym teacher, primary school teacher, digital and multimedia education and tourism. It was founded in 1984 and was allowed by the Portuguese Ministry of Education to provide higher education in 1988 (decree law: Decreto-Lei nº 415/88). ISCE also has an institute in Penafiel called ISCE Douro.

ISCE is a member of:
 UNESCO Associated Schools Project Network
 Founding member of AEDESP
 AIEJI – International Association of Social Educators
 EUROHDIR
 SOCRATES/ERASMUS partner
 LEONARDO DA VINCI partner

It is associated with Picapau and ICE, schools that offers primary to secondary education.

See also
list of colleges and universities in Portugal

External links
 http://www.isce.pt/
 http://www.iscedouro.pt/
 http://www.ice.edu.pt/
 https://web.archive.org/web/20070417222745/http://www.pedago.pt/pica-pau/pica-pau.htm
 Website do Grupo Pedago

Higher education in Portugal